Eloy Alquinta Ross (22 June 1971 - Santiago, 15 March 2004) was a Chilean musician.  He was a member of the band Los Jaivas and Huaika.

Early life 
Eloy was the son of guitarist and vocalist Eduardo "Gato" Aquinta.  His brothers Moisés, Ankatu and Aurora Alquinta are also musicians.

His musical talent developed under the influence of his father and friends. He learned to play the saxophone (alto, soprano and tenor), the trutruca and cultrun . His first band, Huaika, was formed in 1995 with his brother Ankatu and four others ( Francis and John Paul Bosco, Leo and Jorge Yáñez ).

Huaika released two albums, Forgotten Magic ( 1996, produced by Jack Alquinta ) and Full Life ( 2000 ).

Death 

On March 15 of 2004, aged 33, Eloy suffered a heart attack and died. His death was one year after his father's death. Many condolences were send from all the Chilean musical people. When Huaika edits El Rito on 2005, the band dedicate the album to their dead group partner, and Los Jaivas replace Eloy with his band partner Francisco Bosco, who now is a member of both groups.

Eloy left a widow and two children.

Chilean musicians
1971 births
2004 deaths
Musicians from Santiago
Chilean people of English descent
Chilean people of Scottish descent